Paul O'Grady (born 1955) is an English comedian, television presenter, actor, writer, and radio disc jockey.

Paul O'Grady may also refer to:

Paul O'Grady (politician) (1960–2015), Australian politician
Paul O'Grady (footballer) (born 1978), Australian former professional footballer